Audai Hassouna (born 18 October 1998) is a Libyan swimmer. He competed in the men's 200 metre freestyle at the 2020 Summer Olympics.

References

External links
 

1998 births
Living people
Libyan male swimmers
Libyan male freestyle swimmers
Olympic swimmers of Libya
Swimmers at the 2020 Summer Olympics
Place of birth missing (living people)
African Games competitors for Libya
Swimmers at the 2019 African Games